Mazzi Wilkins (born October 12, 1995) is an American football cornerback for the Philadelphia Stars of the United States Football League (USFL). He played college football for South Florida.

College career
Wilkins was a member of the South Florida Bulls for five seasons, redshirting his true freshman year. He finished his collegiate career with 110 tackles, 22 passes defensed, three interceptions, and one fumble recovery in 47 games played, of which he started 22.

Professional career

Tampa Bay Buccaneers
Wilkins signed with the Tampa Bay Buccaneers as an undrafted free agent on July 23, 2019. Wilkins was waived at the end of training camp during final roster cuts, but was re-signed to the team's practice squad on September 1, 2019. The Buccaneers promoted Wilkins to the active roster on November 13, 2019. He made his NFL debut on December 1, 2019, against the Jacksonville Jaguars, making two tackles in a 28–11 win.

Wilkins was waived by the Buccaneers during final roster cuts on September 5, 2020, and was signed to the practice squad the following day. He was elevated to the active roster on September 12 for the team's Week 1 game against the New Orleans Saints, and reverted to the practice squad the day after the game. He was promoted to the active roster on September 19, 2020, but was waived two days later. The Buccaneers re-signed him to their practice squad on October 19. He was released on January 5, 2021.

Wilkins signed with the Alphas of The Spring League in May 2021.

Winnipeg Blue Bombers
Wilkins signed with the Winnipeg Blue Bombers of the CFL on June 22, 2021. He was released on July 27, 2021.

Arizona Cardinals
On September 22, 2021, the Arizona Cardinals signed Wilkins to their practice squad. He was released on September 29, 2021.

Baltimore Ravens
On October 4, 2021, the Baltimore Ravens signed Wilkins to their practice squad.

Philadelphia Stars
On February 22, 2022, the Philadelphia Stars selected Wilkins in the 10th round of the inaugural draft of the newly revived USFL, He was taken as the 18th overall cornerback selected.

NFL Career statistics

References

External links
South Florida Bulls bio
Tampa Bay Buccaneers bio

1995 births
Living people
American football cornerbacks
Arizona Cardinals players
Baltimore Ravens players
Players of American football from Tampa, Florida
Players of Canadian football from Tampa, Florida
South Florida Bulls football players
Tampa Bay Buccaneers players
The Spring League players
Winnipeg Blue Bombers players
Philadelphia Stars (2022) players
Henry B. Plant High School alumni